In the Name of the Law (Turkish: Kanun namina) is a 1952 Turkish drama film directed by Lütfi Akad and starring Ayhan Isik, Gülistan Güzey and Muzaffer Tema.
The film is based on real events regarding a love triangle that led to homicide, that took place in Istanbul, in the following years of World war II.

Main cast
 Ayhan Işık as Nazim  
 Gülistan Güzey as Ayten  
 Muzaffer Tema as Halil  
 Pola Morelli as Perihan  
 Talat Artemel as Sevket  
 Nese Yulaç as Nezahat  
 Settar Körmükçü as Kamil  
 Nubar Terziyan as Mahmut  
 Muazzez Arçay as Zehra  
 Temel Karamahmut as Polis Sefi  
 Renan Fosforoglu 
 Sadettin Erbil as Komiser  
 Riza Tüzün as Doktor  
 Kerim Pamukoglu 
 Mümtaz Alpaslan

References

Bibliography
 Gönül Dönmez-Colin. The Routledge Dictionary of Turkish Cinema. Routledge, 2013.

External links
 

1952 films
1952 crime drama films
1950s Turkish-language films
Turkish crime drama films
Films about lawyers
Films directed by Lütfi Akad
Turkish black-and-white films